The 2006–07 Tunisian Ligue Professionnelle 1 was the 81st season of top-tier football in Tunisia. It saw Étoile du Sahel win the championship. At the other end of the table, Etoile Olympique de la Goulette et Kram and ES Hammam-Sousse were relegated to Ligue Professionnelle 2.

Teams and locations

AS Marsa
Club Africain
CA Bizertin
CS Hammam-Lif
CS Sfaxien
EGS Gafsa
Espérance de Tunis
ES Zarzis
ES Hammam-Sousse
EO Goulette et Kram
Étoile du Sahel
Olympique Béja
Stade Tunisien
US Monastir

Results

League table

Result table

Leaders

References
2006–07 Ligue 1 on RSSSF.com

Tunisian Ligue Professionnelle 1, 2006-07
Tunisian Ligue Professionnelle 1 seasons
1